iLiana Fokianaki is a Greek curator, writer, theorist, educator and former journalist based in Athens and Rotterdam. In May 2022, she was announced as the curator of the 13th edition of the annual festival Survival Kit, organised by the Latvian Center for Contemporary Art, in Riga

She is the founder and director of contemporary art institution State of Concept in Athens, where she curated solo exhibitions of artists such as Laure Prouvost, the research agency Forensic Architecture, Croatian artist Sanja Iveković, Dutch collective Metahaven, the film collective Rojava Film Commune. The exhibition of the Rojava Film Commune Fokianaki curated, titled "Forms of Freedom", was featured in Art Forum magazine in 2020, and has so far travelled to the following institutions: Galerija Nova, in Zagreb, the exhibition space of e-flux publications in New York  and Moderna Galerija / Museum of Modern Art of Slovenia, in Ljubljana.

A retrospective of Fokianaki's institution titled State (in) Concepts was exhibited at Kadist Art Foundation in Paris in 2017. Fokianaki was invited by artist Kader Attia to curate a group exhibition inspired by the program of State of Concept, at La Colonie (Art Space) in May 2018, titled "The Trials of Justice". She has curated the solo exhibition of artist Kapwani Kiwanga at the Formerly Known as Witte de With Center for Contemporary Art in Rotterdam, which coincided with Kiwanga's award for the Marcel Duchamp Prize of the Centre Pompidou.

Fokianaki's work explores the relation between art, formations of power and how they metamorphose under the influence of geopolitics, national identity and cultural and anthropological histories. Her recent project "The Bureau of Care" received the Solidarity Grant of the European Cultural Foundation.

Together with curator Antonia Alampi, she is the co-founder of Future Climates, a platform that aims to propose viable futures for small-scale organizations of contemporary art and culture. Future Climates was part of the "Substance 100", a new, annual list, that outlines a diverse array of artists, activists, collectives, movements and organizations making a substantial change in the world, launched by on-line museum and platform "Collecteurs".

Fokianaki was curator and programmer at Kunsthal Extra City in Antwerp from 2017–2019, where she curated two large-scale group exhibitions: the exhibitions Extra Citizen (2017)  and Extra States: Nations in Liquidation (2018).

Fokianaki is a lecturer at the Dutch Art Institute (DAI) of the ArtEZ University of Arts in the Netherlands, and was a guest lecturer at HISK in Ghent, Belgium  and a resident curator at the NTU Center for Contemporary Art in Singapore.

She writes for various international art journals and publications, discussing issues ranging from art, politics, to ethics such as a joint opinion piece on art, economy and documenta's arrival in Athens, written with former Greek Minister of Finance Yanis Varoufakis and an opinion piece around the discussion of looted artefacts and specifically the Parthenon Marbles for frieze (magazine).

Education
Fokianaki holds a B.A. in Fine Arts from Oxford Brookes University in Oxford and a M.A. in Arts Criticism and Management from 
City University London.

External links
Official website State of Concept
Official website

References

Living people
Greek art curators
Greek women curators
Greek writers
People from Rotterdam
Mass media people from Athens
Year of birth missing (living people)
Greek women writers